Bezverkhovo is a hamlet in Pervomaysky District of Yaroslavl Oblast, Russia. Population: .

References

Rural localities in Yaroslavl Oblast
Pervomaysky District, Yaroslavl Oblast